Nestlera is a genus of South African flowering plants in the tribe Gnaphalieae within the family Asteraceae.

Species
The only accepted species is Nestlera biennis, native to the western part of South Africa.

References

Gnaphalieae
Monotypic Asteraceae genera
Endemic flora of South Africa